Riccardo Piatti (born 8 November 1958) is an Italian tennis coach. He has coached several players ranked within the top 10 by the Association of Tennis Professionals (ATP), including Novak Djokovic, Ivan Ljubičić, Richard Gasquet, Milos Raonic, and Jannik Sinner.

Early life

Piatti began playing tennis at the age of nine at the tennis club of Villa d'Este in Cernobbio, Lombardia, Italy. The idea of becoming a tennis coach first occurred to him at age 20 when the head coach of the Villa d'Este Country Club got injured, and Piatti was asked to replace him.

He spent his formative years learning how to coach at the Nick Bollettieri Tennis Academy (which was later absorbed into the IMG Academy), in Bradenton, Florida.

Riccardo's sister, Carolina, is a tennis instructor, as well.

Coaching career

Piatti began as a private coach for professional players in 1988. Among the early players he coached are Renzo Furlan (career-high world No. 19), Cristiano Caratti (career-high world No. 26), and Omar Camporese (career-high world No. 18).

He began working with Ivan Ljubičić in June 1997, when Ljubičić was ranked No. 954 in the world. This relationship lasted until the end of Ljubičić's professional playing career in 2012. Ljubičić achieved a career-high ranking of world No. 3 while working with Piatti.

From fall 2005 until June 2006, he also coached Novak Djokovic when the Serb was 18. Djokovic parted ways due to Piatti's refusal to work full-time with him. In 2011, Piatti claimed that he knew then (in 2006) that Djokovic "could become number one in the world at the level of Rafael Nadal and Roger Federer because Novak always worked hard as a kid, with the family, and he was very focused and determined to be world number one."

In February 2011, while still coaching world No. 14 Ljubičić, Piatti began to co-coach Richard Gasquet (with Sébastien Grosjean), who was then ranked No. 31 in the world. With Piatti, Gasquet improved to a high ranking of world No. 9, short of his career high No. 7 (achieved in 2007). Piatti ended the relationship abruptly in November 2013 during the season-ending 2013 ATP World Tour Finals.

On 1 December 2013 he began working with Milos Raonic, co-coaching with former student Ivan Ljubičić. At that time, Raonic held an ATP world ranking of No. 11. With Piatti, his ranking rose to a career-high of No. 3.
 
Piatti coached Borna Coric from 2017 till September 2019.
Coric cited one of the main reasons for the split to be the five times Grand Slam champion, Maria Sharapova who also started working with Piatti in 2019. 
 Sharapova and Piatti announced on November 8th 2019 that they would work together for 2020. 

He was the coach of Jannik Sinner, the 2019 #NextGenATP Finals champion, until February 2022.

Piatti is involved with tennis schools, club teams, and summer's clinics on Elba, Italy.

References

External links

1958 births
Living people
Italian tennis coaches
Novak Djokovic coaches